Francisco Cabrera Santos (May 14, 1946 – February 26, 2010) was the Mayor of Valencia, Carabobo in Venezuela.  He led the Communitarian Patriotic Consensus (CONPACO) party.

In 2006 he was one of the finalists for World Mayor.

He died on February 26, 2010.

External links
World Mayor profile

1946 births
2010 deaths
People from Valencia, Venezuela
Mayors of places in Venezuela